The Arizona Wildcats softball program is a college softball team that represents the University of Arizona in the Pac-12 Conference in the National Collegiate Athletic Association. The team has had six head coaches since it started playing organized softball in the 1974 season. The most recent coach was Mike Candrea, who took over the head coaching position in 1986, but has stepped aside to coach the US National Team at the Olympics in 2004 and 2008 before returning, and retired in 2021.

Key

Coaches

Notes

References

Lists of college softball head coaches in the United States

Arizona Wildcats softball coaches